John Pate is an American football coach. He served as the head football coach at Union College in Barbourville, Kentucky (1984), Lees–McRae College in Banner Elk, North Carolina (1991–1993), and Hamline University in St. Paul, Minnesota (2011–2012).

He was a part of five national championship staffs while serving as an assistant at Georgia Southern University.

He served as a US Army Infantry Officer. He is an Airborne Ranger. His service included time as the TOW Platoon Leader, Combat Support Company, 1st Battalion, 15th Infantry in Kitzingen, Germany. He is a graduate of French Commando School #7 in Trier, Germany.

References

Year of birth missing (living people)
Living people
Georgia Southern Eagles football coaches
Hamline Pipers football coaches
High school football coaches in Florida
High school football coaches in North Carolina
Lees–McRae Bobcats football coaches
Union (Kentucky) Bulldogs football coaches
University of North Georgia alumni
American expatriate sportspeople in Norway